Eric Balfour "Bill" Lundie (15 March 1888 – 12 September 1917) was a South African cricketer who played in one Test in 1914.

A fast bowler, Bill Lundie played eight first-class matches for three provinces between 1909 and 1914. His best figures were 6 for 52 in Eastern Province's loss to Border in 1908–09. His only Test, and last first-class match, was the Fifth Test in England's tour of South Africa in 1913–14. Opening the bowling, and bowling into the wind, he took 4 for 101 off 46.3 overs as England made 411. It was the last Test match before World War I.

In the war he served with the South African Service Corps before being commissioned as a second lieutenant in the 3rd Battalion of the Coldstream Guards. He was killed by shellfire during the Battle of Passchendaele on 12 September 1917.

References

External links
 
 

1888 births
1917 deaths
British military personnel killed in World War I
South Africa Test cricketers
South African cricketers
Eastern Province cricketers
Gauteng cricketers
Western Province cricketers